Charles Léon Georges Loizillon (4 September 1878 – 9 May 1960) was a French fencer. He competed in the men's épée event at the 1900 Summer Olympics.

References

External links
 

1878 births
1960 deaths
French male épée fencers
Olympic fencers of France
Fencers at the 1900 Summer Olympics
Sportspeople from Metz
20th-century French people